Laugavegur is a hiking trail in South Iceland. It is the most popular trail in Iceland, with an estimated 75000-100000 people hiking it every year. In 2012, National Geographic listed it as one of the twenty best trails in the world.

Laugavegur runs from the hot springs area of Landmannalaugar to the glacial valley of Þórsmörk. It is noted for the wide variety of landscapes on its path. The route is typically completed over four days, North to South, with stops at the mountain huts of Hrafntinnusker, Álftavatn, and Emstrur. At least three rivers must be forded during the walk. It is possible to combine the trek with a hike over the Fimmvörðuháls route from Þórsmörk to Skógar.

The Laugavegur Ultramarathon has been held annually on the trail since 1997.

References

External links

 
 Laugavegur Ultra Marathon

Hiking trails in Iceland